Jacob Donnell Brumfield (born May 27, 1965) is an American former professional baseball outfielder who played in Major League Baseball for the Cincinnati Reds, Pittsburgh Pirates, Toronto Blue Jays, and Los Angeles Dodgers from 1992 to 1999. He is best known for being involved in a collision with fellow Pirates outfielder Dave Clark during the 1995 season.

References

External links
, or Retrosheet, or Pelota Binaria (Venezuelan Winter League)

1965 births
Living people
African-American baseball players
American expatriate baseball players in Canada
Baseball City Royals players
Baseball players from Louisiana
Birmingham Barons players
Camden Riversharks players
Cardenales de Lara players
American expatriate baseball players in Venezuela
Carolina Mudcats players
Charlotte Knights players
Cincinnati Reds players
Dunedin Blue Jays players
Fort Myers Royals players
Indianapolis Indians players
Los Angeles Dodgers players
Major League Baseball outfielders
Memphis Chicks players
Nashua Pride players
Nashville Sounds players
Omaha Royals players
People from Bogalusa, Louisiana
Pikeville Cubs players
Pittsburgh Pirates players
Syracuse SkyChiefs players
Toronto Blue Jays players
21st-century African-American people
20th-century African-American sportspeople